The 2016–17 NCAA championships were contested by the NCAA throughout the course of the 2016–17 college athletics season to determine the team and individual national champions of 23 different men's and women's sports at the Division I, Division II, and Division III levels. Some sports have championships at all three levels and others have just a single national championship.

Championships

Division I

Single Championship

References

Ncaa
Ncaa